Outram may refer to:

Places 
 Outram, Nova Scotia, an unincorporated district in Canada
 Outram, Saskatchewan, a community in Canada
 Outram, New Zealand, a small town in Otago
 Outram, Singapore, a district in central Singapore
 Outram Ghat, in Kolkata, India
 Outram Island, one of the Andaman Islands, India
 Outram Street, Perth, Australia

People 
 Benjamin Outram (1764–1805), English civil engineer
 Benjamin Fonseca Outram (1774–1856), English naval surgeon
 Gary Outram (born 1976), South African cricketer
 George Outram (1805–1856), Scottish humorous poet
 James Outram (mountaineer) (1864–1925), British mountaineer
 Sir James Outram, 1st Baronet (1803–1863), British Indian military and political leader
 John Outram (born 1934), British architect
 Martin Outram, English violist
 Percy Outram (1903–1981), Australian rules footballer
 Richard Outram (1930–2005), Canadian poet
 Roy Outram (1901–1987), Australian rules footballer
 Outram Bangs (1863–1932), American zoologist

Other uses 
 Outram Secondary School, in Singapore
 123rd Outram's Rifles, a regiment of the British Indian Army